Kenneth D. "Ken" Ard (born June 30, 1960) is an American dancer, choreographer, actor and singer.

Early life 
Ard was born in Oakland, California in 1960. His mother exposed him to jazz through frequent visits to musical in San Francisco and Oakland. Ard also proved to be an especially good gymnast, winning the California youth gymnastics championship at 16.

After dancing at the Oakland Ballet and San Francisco Ballet, he was approached by Jon Hendricks for a lead role in his show, Evolution of the Blues, to be presented in the Golden Gate Theatre in San Francisco.

Career 
Ard was asked to choreograph for shows in Hawaii. When Alvin Ailey came to Hawaii, he asked Ard to dance in his American Dance Theater. But after a few months, Ard missed the dynamic of the combination of song and dance, and auditioned for a Broadway show for which he was selected, Cats, Starlight Express, Song and Dance, Jelly's Last Jam and Smokey Joe's Cafe.

Ard appeared in the 2002 film Chicago and 1996 film Seven Servants.

Ard collaborated with many of Europe's notable jazz artists. The beginning of 2009 marked the release of Ballads, Blues & Cocktails, Ard's first jazz CD.

Ard teaches jazz dance and musical dance at the Frank Sanders Musical Academy and Codarts in the Netherlands. Since 2014, he has also taught at the Alvin Ailey American Dance Theater.

Filmography

Film

Television

External links

References 

1960 births
Living people
Crooners
American male dancers
American male film actors
American male singers
Male actors from Oakland, California
Musicians from Oakland, California
American male television actors
Singers from California